The honorary citizen award is the highest decoration of Hamburg, Germany. The awards have been given sporadically since 1813, originally only to non-Hamburg citizens (with one exception, Johannes Brahms in 1889) "to make them as one of us" (um sie zu einem der unseren zu machen). Since 1948, it has been extended to Hamburg citizens as well.

The awards are given by the Senate of Hamburg, and since 1848 the state parliament (Hamburgische Bürgerschaft) is asked to confirm the honor. It can also be revoked (as in the case of Adolf Hitler and Hermann Göring), and gives no rights or duty.

Honorary Citizens of the Free and Hanseatic City of Hamburg
Listed by year of award:

Revoked
 1933 Adolf Hitler (1889–1945) revoked 1945
 1937 Hermann Göring (1893–1946) revoked 1945

References

Hamburg
honorary citizens
Honorary citizens of Hamburg
Hamburg, Honorary Citizens of